Tiddington-with-Albury is a civil parish in South Oxfordshire. It includes the village of Albury (Ordnance Survey grid reference SP655051), the larger village of Tiddington (OS Grid ref. SP649051) and the hamlet of Draycot (Ordnance Survey grid reference SP6460). It was formed by a merger of the civil parishes of Albury and Tiddington in 1932 and in 2011 had a population of 660 across an area of 4.4 km².

Sources

References

Civil parishes in Oxfordshire
South Oxfordshire District